American oil palm can refer to:

 Species of Attalea, including
Attalea maripa, also called Maripa palm
Elaeis oleifera